English singer-songwriter Jack Savoretti has released seven studio albums, one compilation album, two extended plays (EPs) and 29 singles.

Albums

Studio albums

Compilation albums

Extended plays

Singles

As lead artist

As featured artist

Guest appearances

B-sides

Music videos

References

Discographies of British artists
Discographies of Italian artists
Folk music discographies
Pop music discographies